Christopher Reinhardt (born 3 July 1997) is a German rower.

He won a medal at the 2019 World Rowing Championships.

References

External links

1997 births
Living people
German male rowers
World Rowing Championships medalists for Germany